Ukrop (literally "dill") is a Russian language ethnic slur which refers to Ukrainians. The term is a reference to the dill plant and bears a superficial syntactical similarity with the first half of the Russian word for Ukrainians.

It was adopted as an ironic nickname by Ukrainian soldiers during the Donbas war in 2014, and a shoulder patch designed by Andriy Yermolenko. It lost popularity after it was adopted by a political organization UKROP.

References

Russian slang
Pejorative terms for European people
Internet memes introduced from Russia